"(I'm A) Stand by My Woman Man" is a song written by Kent Robbins, and recorded by American country music artist Ronnie Milsap.  It was released in July 1976 as the second single from the album 20/20 Vision.  The song was Milsap's sixth number one on the country chart.  The single stayed at number one for two weeks and spent a total of eleven weeks within the top 40.
It is an answer song to Tammy Wynette's Stand By Your Man.  Backing vocals were provided by The Holladay Sisters.

According to Milsap, the song was "almost" a lawsuit because the opening piano melody, played by session musician Hargus "Pig" Robbins, sounded similar to Robbins' intro on "Behind Closed Doors".

Charts

Weekly charts

Year-end charts

References

External links
 

1976 singles
1976 songs
Ronnie Milsap songs
Songs written by Kent Robbins
Song recordings produced by Tom Collins (record producer)
RCA Records singles